Heidi Kollanen (born 6 June 1997) is a Finnish footballer who plays as a forward and has appeared for the Finland women's national team.

Career
Kollanen has been capped for the Finland national team, appearing for the team during the 2019 FIFA Women's World Cup qualifying cycle.

International goals

References

External links
 
 
 
 
 

1997 births
Living people
Finnish women's footballers
Finland women's international footballers
Women's association football forwards
Florida State Seminoles women's soccer players
Damallsvenskan players
KIF Örebro DFF players
Finnish expatriate sportspeople in the United States
Finnish expatriate sportspeople in Italy
Finnish expatriate sportspeople in Sweden
Expatriate women's footballers in Italy
Expatriate women's footballers in Sweden
Expatriate women's soccer players in the United States
Finnish expatriate footballers
U.P.C. Tavagnacco players
PK-35 Vantaa (women) players
Ilves players
UEFA Women's Euro 2022 players